Elementa linguae daco-romanae sive valachicae ("Elements of the Daco-Roman or Vlach/Wallachian language") is a Romanian grammar book written by Samuil Micu-Klein and revised by Gheorghe Șincai in 1780 at the Saint Barbara College in Vienna. It was printed by Joseph typography, owned by the nobleman of Kurzböck, in the same year. The book, and subsequently the year, are considered the starting point of the Romanian language's modern form.

Content
The book's introduction is written by Gheorghe Șincai and it is a synthesis of historic and linguistic views held by the Transylvanian School.

The main body of the book is divided into four parts: De ortographia, De etymologhia, De syntaxi, and an Appendix containing a chapter about "the formation of Daco-Roman words from the Latin ones".

De ortographia is in particular important because the author describes the changes from Latin phonemes to Romanian ones. Lacking the corresponding letters to mark the sounds for  ă, î, k`, g`, č, ğ, ș, ț, Samuil Micu-Klein appeals to similarities to other language like German, Italian, or Hungarian, opting for a less phonemic orthography than the one used in the current writing system, with rules derived from Latin orthography to designate the new sounds of the language. For example á or aa would stand for standard a sound, while a without an accent would represent the schwa sound, nowadays written as ă.

References

Romanian grammar
History of the Romanian language
1780 books
18th-century Latin books